Ramaria flaccida is a species of coral fungus in the family Gomphaceae. Originally described as Clavaria flaccida by Elias Fries in 1821, the species was transferred to Ramaria by Hubert Bourdot in 1898.

References

Gomphaceae
Fungi of Europe
Fungi of North America
Fungi described in 1821
Taxa named by Elias Magnus Fries